The 1993 Northwestern Wildcats team represented Northwestern University during the 1993 NCAA Division I-A football season. In their second year under head coach Gary Barnett, the Wildcats compiled a 2–9 record (0–8 against Big Ten Conference opponents) and finished in ninth place in the Big Ten Conference.

The team's offensive leaders were quarterback Len Williams with 2,047 passing yards, Dennis Lundy with 617 rushing yards, and Lee Gissendaner with 669 receiving yards.

Schedule

Roster

References

Northwestern
Northwestern Wildcats football seasons
Northwestern Wildcats football